Mihrişah Emine Kadın ("sun/light of the Şah" and "trustworthy" or "benign"; died April 1732) was a consort of Sultan Ahmed III and the mother of Sultan Mustafa III.

Life
After entering the imperial harem she was given the name Mihrişah (meaning "Sun of the Şah" in Persian). 

The couple had four sons together. On 25 August 1710 she gave birth to her first son Şehzade Süleyman, on 28 January 1717 she gave birth to her second son Şehzade Mustafa.

Ahmed was deposed in 1730, and his nephew Mahmud I ascended the throne. Mihrişah along with other ladies and daughters of Ahmed's harem went to the Eski Palace.

Death and aftermath
She died in April 1732, and was buried in the mausoleum of Imperial Ladies, New Mosque, Istanbul.

Şehzade Mustafa ascended the throne as Mustafa III after Sultan Osman III's death in 1757. However, she was never Valide Sultan, as she had died before Mustafa ascended the throne. He commissioned the Ayazma Mosque in memory of his mother, and elder brother Şehzade Süleyman. A fountain is also present near her tomb.

Issue
Together with Ahmed, Mihrişah had at least four sons:
 Şehzade Süleyman (25 August 1710 - 11 October 1732, buried in New Mosque, Istanbul). He died in the Kafes after two years of reclusion. 
 Mustafa III (Edirne Palace, Edirne, 28 January 1717 - Istanbul, Turkey, 21 January 1774, buried in Laleli Mosque, Fatih, Istanbul). 26th Sultan of the Ottoman Empire. 
Şehzade Bayezid (4 October 1718 - 24 January 1771, buried in New Mosque, Istanbul). He died in the Kafes after forty-one years of reclusion. 
Şehzade Seyfeddin (3 February 1728 – 1732, buried in New Mosque, Istanbul).

See also
Ottoman Empire
Ottoman dynasty
Ottoman family tree
List of sultans of the Ottoman Empire
Line of succession to the Ottoman throne
Ottoman Emperors family tree (simplified)
List of consorts of the Ottoman Sultans

References

Sources
 
 
 
 
 
 

1732 deaths
18th-century consorts of Ottoman sultans
Slaves from the Ottoman Empire
18th-century slaves
Mothers of Ottoman sultans